The NCAA Division III Wrestling Championships for  individuals and teams were first officially sponsored in 1974 and have since been held annually.

The NCAA Division III Wrestling Championships is a double-elimination tournament for individuals competing in ten weight classes. Eighteen wrestlers in each class qualify by being one of the top three finishers at six Regional tournaments.  During the championships, individual match winners earn points based on the level and quality of the victory, which are totaled to determine the team championship standings.

In addition to determining the national championship, the NCAA Division III Wrestling Championships also determine the Division III All-America team. The top eight finishers in each weight class qualify for Division III All-American status.

Team champions
Prior to 1963, only a single national championship was held for all members of the NCAA; Division II competition began in 1963, with Division III following in 1974.
School names used are those current in the years listed.

Note: Shaded scores = Closest margin of victory,  point in 1979 & widest margin of victory, 82 points in 2003.

Team titles
Source

 A = Was Trenton State College.
 B = Was Montclair State College.
 C = Was Wilkes College.

See also
NCAA Division I Wrestling Championships
NCAA Division II Wrestling Championships
NAIA national wrestling championship
Canadian Interuniversity Sport
Pre-NCAA Wrestling Champion
Intercollegiate women's wrestling champions

References

External links
NCAA Division III wrestling

Wrestling
NCAA Wrestling Championship
Championship
Recurring sporting events established in 1974
1974 establishments in Pennsylvania